Searchin' for a Rainbow is the fourth studio album by The Marshall Tucker Band, released in 1975.

Track listing
All songs written by Toy Caldwell, except where noted.

Side one
"Fire on the Mountain" (George McCorkle) - 3:53
"Searchin' for a Rainbow" - 3:48
"Walkin' and Talkin'" - 2:25
"Virginia" - 4:54

Side two
"Bob Away My Blues" - 2:42
"Keeps Me from All Wrong" (Tommy Caldwell) - 4:13
"Bound and Determined" - 4:20
"Can't You See" (recorded live July 11, 1974 at the Performing Arts Center in Milwaukee, Wisconsin) - 6:25

2004 CD reissue bonus track
"It Takes Time" (recorded live April 1980 Ann Arbor, MI) - 3:43

Personnel
Doug Gray - lead vocals, percussion
Toy Caldwell - electric and acoustic guitars, steel guitar, lead vocals on "Can't You See"
Tommy Caldwell - bass guitar, backing vocals
George McCorkle - electric and acoustic guitars, banjo
Jerry Eubanks - alto, baritone and tenor saxophone, flute, backing vocals
Paul Riddle - drums

Guest musicians:
Dickey Betts - guitar solo on "Searchin' For A Rainbow"
Paul Hornsby – piano, organ
Charlie Daniels – fiddle
Chuck Leavell – electric piano
Jerome Joseph – congas
Al McDonald – mandolin
Leo LaBranche – trumpet and horn section arrangements

Production:
Paul Hornsby - producer
George Marino - mastering engineer

Charts
Album

Singles

References

1975 albums
Marshall Tucker Band albums
Albums produced by Paul Hornsby
Capricorn Records albums